The anterior longitudinal ligament is a ligament that runs down the anterior surface of the spine. It traverses all of the vertebral bodies and intervertebral discs on their ventral side. It may be partially cut to treat certain abnormal curvatures in the vertebral column, such as kyphosis.

Structure 
The anterior longitudinal ligament runs down the vertebral bodies and intervertebral discs of all of the vertebrae on their ventral side. The ligament is thick and slightly more narrow over the vertebral bodies and thinner but slightly wider over the intervertebral discs. This effect is much less pronounced than that seen in the posterior longitudinal ligament. It tends to be narrower and thicker around thoracic vertebrae, but wider and thinner around cervical vertebrae and lumbar vertebrae.

The anterior longitudinal ligament has three layers: superficial, intermediate and deep. The superficial layer traverses 3 – 4 vertebrae, the intermediate layer covers 2 – 3 and the deep layer is only between individual vertebrae.

Clinical significance 
The anterior longitudinal ligament may become calcified, causing back pain.

Surgical release 
The anterior longitudinal ligament may be "released", or partially cut, between two adjacent vertebrae. This may be done to treat abnormal curvature in the vertebral column, such as kyphosis. Osteoporosis, some infections, and past back surgery may prevent this surgery.

Additional images

See also 
Intervertebral disc
Posterior longitudinal ligament

References

External links 
  - "Vertebral Column, Dissection, Anterior & Posterior Views"
 
 Diagram at spineuniverse.com

Ligaments of the torso
Bones of the vertebral column
Ligaments of the head and neck